Kathleen Elaine "Peg" Batty (15 December 1920 – 16 December 2008) was a New Zealand cricketer who played primarily as a right-arm medium bowler. She appeared in four Test matches for New Zealand between 1949 and 1954. She played domestic cricket for Auckland.

References

External links
 
 

1920 births
2008 deaths
Cricketers from Auckland
New Zealand women cricketers
New Zealand women Test cricketers
Auckland Hearts cricketers